John Harley  (1833, Stanton Lacy, Shropshire – 9 December 1921, Pulborough, Sussex) was an English physician, geologist, and botanist. He gave the 1868 Goulstonian Lectures and the 1889 Lumleian Lectures.

Biography
In the parish of Dawley Magna, John Harley was christened on 21 November 1833. He studied medicine at King’s College London and received his medical qualification in 1858. At King's College Hospital, he held house appointments and then in 1863 was appointed assistant physician. In 1871 he left King's College Hospital to join the staff of London's St Thomas' Hospital. There he began in 1871 as an assistant physician, in 1879 became a full physician, and in 1893 was created consulting physician. He also served at the London Fever Hospital. He retired in 1902 and for the remainder of his life resided in Pulburough.

Some of his opinions of the origins of some diseases seemed contrary to what was known about bacteriology and pathology. He was widely known for his eccentric geniality with a fixed "habit of smiling, bowing, and vigorously shaking hands on every possible occasion with every acquaintance that he met."

In 1881 he lived in St George Hanover Square with his wife Maria and their five children (four daughters and a son).

Harley was elected in 1863 a Fellow of the Linnean Society of London and in 1867 a Fellow of the Royal College of Physicians. He bequeathed his geological collection to the Ludlow Museum.

Selected publications

Articles
 
 
 
  (See scarlet fever.)
  (See poison hemlock.)
  (Sclermea is induration of cellular tissue.)

References

1833 births
1921 deaths
Alumni of King's College London
19th-century English medical doctors
20th-century English medical doctors
British general practitioners
Fellows of the Linnean Society of London
Fellows of the Royal College of Physicians